Briggs is a populated place situated in Yavapai County, Arizona, United States.

References

Populated places in Yavapai County, Arizona